Dwayne Allen Henry (born February 16, 1962) is a former Major League Baseball relief pitcher who played for the Texas Rangers, Atlanta Braves, Houston Astros, Cincinnati Reds, Seattle Mariners and Detroit Tigers. In , he pitched in Japan for the Chunichi Dragons.

Henry made his major league debut on September 7, after being drafted in the second round of the 1980 Major League Baseball Draft. He struck out Chris Speier for his first Major League strikeout. Henry's career ended when the Tigers released him on October 12, . In his career, Henry played in Major League Baseball for the Texas Rangers from 1984 to 1988, Atlanta Braves in 1989 and 1990, Houston Astros in 1991, Cincinnati Reds in 1992 and 1993, Seattle Mariners in 1993, and Detroit Tigers in 1995. He played in Nippon Professional Baseball for the Chunichi Dragons in 1994, and in the Chinese Professional Baseball League for the Wei Chuan Dragons in 1997 and 1998 and Chinatrust Whales in 2000. He also played in Minor League Baseball for the Colorado Rockies in 1996, in the Atlantic League of Professional Baseball for the Somerset Patriots in 1998 and 1999 and the Newark Bears in 2001, and in the Mexican League for the Broncos de Reynosa in 2001.

References

External links

1962 births
Living people
African-American baseball players
American expatriate baseball players in Japan
American expatriate baseball players in Taiwan
Baseball players from Maryland
Chunichi Dragons players
Cincinnati Reds players
Detroit Tigers players
Houston Astros players
Major League Baseball pitchers
Newark Bears players
People from New Castle County, Delaware
Richmond Braves players
Seattle Mariners players
Somerset Patriots players
Texas Rangers players
Chinatrust Whales players
Wei Chuan Dragons players
People from Elkton, Maryland
21st-century African-American people
20th-century African-American sportspeople